"Pure Love" is the song which also marked the first country chart-topping single by its writer, Eddie Rabbitt, a country music singer.

Background
Rabbitt had tasted previous success with 70's "Kentucky Rain", sung by Elvis Presley. In the song, Eddie Rabbitt compares "pure love" to such things as milk, honey and the Cap'n Crunch breakfast cereal, before pointing out that the love shared between the protagonist and his/her object of affection is "99  percent pure" (borrowing from the old Ivory soap advertising slogan).
Eddie Rabbitt would later record the song as the B-side to his 1975 single "Forgive and Forget".

Track listing

Background
"Pure Love" is a song recorded by American country music singer Ronnie Milsap.  It was released in March 1974 as the first single and title track from the album Pure Love.  The song was Milsap's first No. 1 hit on the Billboard Hot Country Singles chart in the late spring of the year.  Although Milsap had two previous top 15 hits—"I Hate You" and "That Girl Who Waits on Tables," both 1973—"Pure Love" is largely credited as being his career-breaking hit.

Chart performance

Sources

1974 singles
Eddie Rabbitt songs
RCA Records singles
Ronnie Milsap songs
Songs written by Eddie Rabbitt
Song recordings produced by Tom Collins (record producer)
1974 songs